Eohemithiris is a genus of brachiopods belonging to the family Basiliolidae.

The species of this genus are found in Northern America and Australia.

Species:

Eohemithiris alexi 
Eohemithiris grayi
Eohemithyris gettysburgensis 
Eohemithyris miriaensis 
Eohemithyris wildei 
Rhynchonella grayi

References

Brachiopod genera